A spodik (or spodek;  , from Polish spodek "saucer") is a tall, black fur hat worn by some Hasidic Jews, particularly by members of sects in 19th-century Congress Poland. The origins of the spodik and the shtreimel are unclear, but it is often thought that the Jews living in Europe adopted wearing fur hats from the Eastern European culture, and perhaps from the nobility, replacing the sudra.

Description
Spodiks are to be distinguished from kolpiks, and from shtreimels, which are a similar types of fur hat worn by Hasidim. Shtreimels are shorter in height, wider, and donut-shaped, while spodiks are taller, thinner in bulk, and of cylindrical shape. Kolpiks and spodiks have the same shape, but the former are brown, while the latter are black. Such hats are typically worn only on special occasions, such as the Sabbath, holidays, and weddings.

Spodiks used to be made from fisher tails. Nowadays they are made also from fox fur.

Use
Ger Hasidim, being the largest Hasidic community of Polish origin, are the most famous for wearing spodiks. Virtually all married men among the Gerer Hasidim wear a spodik. Due to an edict by the Grand Rabbi of Ger designed to stop the extravagance of the hats, Gerrer Hasidim are only allowed to purchase fake fur spodiks that cost less than $600.

Other groups that wear Spodiks include Alexander, Amshinov, Ashlag, Kotzk, Modzitz, Ozharov, Radzin and Sochatchov.

See also

 Shtreimel - traditional Jewish fur hat
 Kolpik - traditional Jewish fur hat
 List of headgear

References

Fur
Hasidic clothing
Hats
Religious headgear